Darshana is a border railway station in Darsana, Bangladesh, situated in Damurhuda Upazila of Chuadanga District, in Khulna Division. It is a rail transit point and a border checkpoint on the India-Bangladesh border.

History
Darshana to Jagotee, Kushtia rail line was first opened on 15 November 1861. It is the first rail road in East Bengal. This rail road established sugarcane supply chain between Darsana (Carew) and Jagotee Sugar mills. Later on this rail road was extended up to Goalundo Ghat. 
Darshana - Rana Ghat (India) -Benapole -Jessore -Khulna passenger railway communication continued until the early 1960s between East Pakistan and India. Then Darshana to Jessore railway was established and the service discontinued.
Darsana station came up with the Eastern Bengal Railway opening the line from Calcutta to Goalundo Ghat, in 1871.

The Maitree Express passes through this station.

Main Lines

References

Railway stations in Chuadanga District
Bangladesh–India railway border crossings